Lesbian Connection (LC) is an American grassroots network forum publication "for, by and about lesbians". Founded in 1974 by the lesbian-feminist collective Ambitious Amazons, the magazine is run by the Elsie Publishing Institute, a Michigan-based 501(c)(3) nonprofit corporation. In 2016, its total revenue was $520,406. Lesbian Connection is published bimonthly and although it has a suggested yearly subscription, it is notable for offering it on a sliding scale basis (asking for flexible donations based on each subscriber's ability to pay). LC is made available to incarcerated women, and mailed free of charge upon request to those unable to make a financial contribution.

A unique aspect of LC is the fact that its content is largely submitted by its readers. News and announcements of interest to the lesbian community include current affairs, places to live, travel, women's music festivals, womyn's land, special events, gatherings, reviews, and obituaries. It features special topics, reprints of the comic strip Dykes to Watch Out For, and an annual "Contact Dykes" international list of lesbians who volunteer to provide information about their hometowns to other women. It does not publish fiction, personal ads, or requests for pen pals.

Lesbian Connection was instrumental in the building of national spiritual, political and social networks for lesbians.

See also

 List of lesbian periodicals
 List of lesbian periodicals in the United States

References

Further reading

External links
 
  Lesbian Connection at JSTOR

1974 establishments in Michigan
1974 in LGBT history
Magazines established in 1974
Feminist magazines
Lesbian culture
Lesbian-related magazines
Lesbian separatism
LGBT in Michigan
Magazines published in Michigan
Women in Michigan
Bimonthly magazines published in the United States
Feminism in the United States
Lesbian history in the United States
LGBT-related magazines published in the United States
Women's magazines published in the United States
East Lansing, Michigan